Primm may refer to:

Places in the United States

Nevada and California
 Primm, Nevada, an unincorporated community
 Primm 300, an off-road race
 Primm Valley Resorts, a group of three hotel-casinos
 Primm Valley Resort, a hotel and casino
 Primm Valley Golf Club, part of the resort and located in San Bernardino County, California

Tennessee
 Primm Springs, Tennessee, an unincorporated community
 Primm Springs Historic District
 Primm Park, a park in Brentwood
 Owen-Primm House, a historic house in Brentwood

Texas
 Kirtley, Texas, an unincorporated community formerly known as Primm

People
 Beny Primm (1928–2015), American physician
 Gary Primm, American casino developer and former chairman and chief executive of Primm Valley Resorts
 J. P. Primm (born 1989), American basketball player
 Werner Primm (1904–1988), German sculpto

Other uses
 "Primm" (Hacks), 2nd episode of American comedy-drama TV series Hacks